Keith Alfred Hindwood (1904-1971) was a Sydney-based Australian businessman and amateur ornithologist.  He joined the Royal Australasian Ornithologists Union (RAOU) in 1924, served as President 1944–1946, and was elected a Fellow of the RAOU in 1951.  He was the most prolific contributor to the RAOU journal, the Emu, with some 600 pages of contributions from his first major paper in 1926 to his death.  He coauthored, with Arnold McGill, The Birds of Sydney (1958).  In 1959 he was awarded the Australian Natural History Medallion.

References
 McGill, A.R. (1971). Obituary. Keith Alfred Hindwood. Emu 71: 183–184.
 Robin, Libby. (2001). The Flight of the Emu: a hundred years of Australian ornithology 1901-2001. Carlton, Vic. Melbourne University Press. 

Hindwood, Keith
1904 births
1971 deaths
20th-century Australian zoologists